Mydromera carmina is a moth of the subfamily Arctiinae. It was described by Schaus in 1938. It is found on Cuba.

References

 Natural History Museum Lepidoptera generic names catalog

Arctiinae
Moths described in 1938
Endemic fauna of Cuba